George Washington Lucas (1845 – May 17, 1921) was an American soldier, who was a Private in the Union Army and a Medal of Honor recipient for his actions in the American Civil War.

Medal of Honor citation
Rank and organization: Private, Company C, 3d Missouri Cavalry. Place and date: At Benton, Ark., July 25, 1864. Entered service at: Mt. Sterling, Brown County, Ill. Birth: Adams County, Ill. Date of issue: December 1864.

Citation:

Pursued and killed Confederate Brig. Gen. George M. Holt, Arkansas Militia, capturing his arms and horse.

See also

List of Medal of Honor recipients
List of American Civil War Medal of Honor recipients: G–L

References

External links

1845 births
1921 deaths
United States Army Medal of Honor recipients
United States Army soldiers
People from Adams County, Illinois
People of Illinois in the American Civil War
American Civil War recipients of the Medal of Honor